Deshabandu Tony Ranasinghe ( 1937 - 2015 ), was an actor in Sri Lankan cinema, theater and television.Widely regarded as one of the greatest actors in Sinhala cinema of all - time , Tony is highly praised for his unique facial expressions , voice , the variety of body languages & some of the hard - tensioned roles which were extremely difficult to act , such as Sarath's role in  Ahasin Polowata  , Nissanka's role in  Delovak Athara  etc 

 According to critics, he is the last Crowned king in Sri Lankan cinema to die after Gamini Fonseka and  Joe Abeywickrama.

He has acted in 115 films, in 43 of which he was the leading actor and in 72 of which he played a supporting role. Also he has contributed as a script writer in two films.

Personal life
Ranasinghe Hettiarachchilage Ignatius Anthony Silva, who later became popular as Tony Ranasinghe, was born July 31, 1937 in Modara to Emmanuel Cyril and Lilian Fernando as the second of the family. He had 8 siblings in the family - The eldest is the Ralex. Other younger members include Stella, Marie, Gina, Romwell, Christopher, and Daya. He studied at St. Anthony's College, Wattala, and De LaSalle College, Modera. His father worked as a Technical Officer in the Department of Posts and Telecommunications. He joined Modara Dilasal College in 1948 to study English. He was a cricket fan during school times and used to collected photographs of Don Bradman.

He started his career as an English stenographer and quit from the job after few months. He changes his name to an advertisement for the 1962 drama "Bodinkarayo" with the influence from his brother Ralex.

He was married to longtime partner Sirima Indrani Wickramasuriya. The wedding was celebrated on 30 April 1962. Ranasinghe died on 16 June 2015 at a public hospital in Colombo at the age of 77.

Career
Ranasinghe began his career in theater with a role in Dharmasiri Wickramaratne's Ran Thodu in 1963, which won him the Governor General's Award for Best Stage Actor. This award was presented by minister T. B. Ilangaratne. His first film appearance was for Sirisena Wimalaweera's Punchi Amma but was not screened due to an economic crisis.

Ranasinghe made his film debut with Lester James Peries' Gamperaliya (1964) and followed it with Ran Salu with a different villain role in the film. He worked with Peries again on Delovak Athara, in which he had the starring role. He continued to play many main protagonist role in several critically acclaimed blockbuster movies such as Parasathu Mal, Baddegama, Hulawali, Duhulu Malak, Hanthane Kathawa, Pawuru Walalu and Le Kiri Kandulu.

In his early days, Ranasinghe also appeared in many stage dramas with the collaboration with Sugathapala de Silva's drama group "Ape Kattiya". He acted in the plays Bodimkarayo, Thattu Gewal, Waguru Bima, Virupi Muhuna, Harima Badu Hayak, Julius Caesar and Veniciye Velenda.

He also acted in few television serials such as Awarjana, Suwanda Kekulu, Raigam Yaluwo, Ekata Getuma, Hathe Wasama, Manokaya, Soorya Vinsathi and Kadamuna.

In addition to acting, he contributed to the script and drama production. Some of them include Koti Waligaya, Awaragira, Tharanaya, Pawuru Walalu, Kelimadala and Duwata Mawaka Misa. He worked as the producer of stage plays Julius Caesar, Balawa Nawaka Aruma and Dolosweni Rathriya. He was also a talented author. He wrote the books Jogi Hamarai, Hemadama Oba Mage and Mata Kawuruth Adare Na. Then he wrote the novel Adaraneeya Ayra in weekly parts to Sarasaviya magazine.

Author work
 Adaraneeya Ayra
 Jogi Hamarai
 Doloswana Rathriya
 Haemadama Oba Mage
 Mata Kawuruth Adare Na

Awards
Ranasinghe was awarded the Best Supporting Actor Sarasaviya Award in 1966 for his role in Parasathu Mal. Subsequently he won Best Actor Awards for Hanthane Kathawa (1969), Duhulu Malak (1976) and Ahasin Polawata (1979). In 1980 he played the father of the protagonist in Ganga Addara. 1993's Saptha Kanya won him Best Actor Awards from Sarasaviya, Swarna Sanka, Presidential and OCIC.

Ranasinghe has dabbled in screenplay writing, winning Sarasaviya Awards for Koti Waligaya, Keli Mandala, Awaragira (1995) and Pavuru Walalu. Ranasinghe was honoured with the Deshabandu award, third highest national honour awarded in Sri Lanka in 1988.

Filmography

Script writing

Stage dramas

References

External links
Tony Ranasinghe's Biography in Sinhala Cinema Database
 
ජීවිත සලරුවක මතක සටහන්
රංගවේදියකුගේ සදහටම සමුගැනීම
ටෝනි නම් රසවතා
දොස් ඇති මිනිසුන් නිදොස් කළ ටෝනි
දේවදූතයෝ සපිරිවරින් ඔබ නිදි ගැන්මට ගී ගයත්වා
පරම්පරා දෙකක් ටෝනි දකින හැටි
අපට ජීවිතය කියාදී මහා නළුවා යන්නටම ගියේය
සුබ උපන් දිනයක්

1937 births
2015 deaths
Sri Lankan male film actors
Sri Lankan Roman Catholics
Sinhalese male actors
Deshabandu